Theodore Childress "Chill" Wills (July 18, 1902 – December 15, 1978) was an American actor and a singer in the Avalon Boys quartet.

Early life
Wills was born in Seagoville, Texas, on July 18, 1902.

Career
He was a performer from early childhood, forming and leading the Avalon Boys singing group in the 1930s. After appearing in a few Westerns, he disbanded the group in 1938, and struck out on a solo acting career.

One of his more memorable roles was that of the distinctive voice of Francis the Talking Mule in a series of popular films. Wills' deep, rough voice, with its Western twang, was matched to the personality of the cynical, sardonic mule. As was customary at the time, Wills was given no billing for his vocal work, though he was featured prominently on-screen as blustery General Ben Kaye in the fourth entry, Francis Joins the WACS. He provided the deep voice for Stan Laurel's performance of "The Trail of the Lonesome Pine" in Way Out West (1937), in which the Avalon Boys Quartet appeared.

Wills was cast in numerous serious film roles, including as "the city of Chicago" as personified by a phantom police sergeant in the film noir City That Never Sleeps (1953), and that of Uncle Bawley in Giant (1956), which also features Rock Hudson, Elizabeth Taylor, and James Dean. Wills was nominated for the Academy Award for Best Supporting Actor for his role as Davy Crockett's companion Beekeeper in the film The Alamo (1960). However, his aggressive campaign for the award was considered tasteless by many, including the film's star/director/producer John Wayne, who publicly apologized for Wills. His publicity agent, Wojciechowicz "Bow Wow" Wojtkiewicz (former husband of gossip columnist Sheilah Graham), accepted blame for the ill-advised effort, claiming that Wills knew nothing about it. The Oscar was won by Peter Ustinov for his role as Lentulus Batiatus in Spartacus.

Wills was a poker player and a close friend of Benny Binion, the founder of the World Series of Poker and former owner of Binion's Horseshoe Casino in Las Vegas, Nevada. Wills participated in the first World Series, held in 1970, and is seated in the center of the famous picture with a number of legendary players.

In 1959, he starred as Bije Wilcox in "The Bije Wilcox Story" on Wagon Train.

In Rory Calhoun's Western series The Texan, Wills appeared in the lead role in the 1960 episode titled "The Eyes of Captain Wylie".

Wills starred in the short-run series Frontier Circus, which aired for only one season (1961–62) on CBS. In 1966, he was cast in the role of a shady Texas rancher, Jim Ed Love, in the short-lived comedy/Western series The Rounders (reprising his role in the 1965 film The Rounders, starring Henry Fonda), with co-stars Ron Hayes, Patrick Wayne, and Walker Edmiston.
In 1962 he guest-starred on Gunsmoke, as a deranged mountain man, and old friend of Matt Dillon, preying on homesteaders. His murderous rampage results in his violent  death. 

In 19631964, Wills joined William Lundigan, Walter Brennan, and Efrem Zimbalist Jr. in making appearances on behalf of U.S. Senator Barry Goldwater, the Republican nominee in the campaign against U.S. President Lyndon B. Johnson. Later, in 1968, Wills refused to support Richard Nixon for the presidency and served as master of ceremonies for George C. Wallace, former governor of Alabama, for the California campaign stops in Wallace's presidential campaign. Wills was among the few Hollywood celebrities to endorse Wallace's bid against Nixon and Hubert H. Humphrey; another was Walter Brennan.

Also in 1968, he starred in the Gunsmoke episode "A Noose for Dobie Price", where he played Elihu Gorman, a former outlaw who joins forces with Marshal Matt Dillon, played by James Arness, to track down a member of his former gang who has escaped jail. In 1971, he appeared as Pat Reedy on The Men from Shiloh (rebranded name of the TV Western The Virginian) in the episode titled "The Angus Killer".

His last role was in 1978, as a janitor in Stubby Pringle's Christmas.

Death
On December 15, 1978, Wills died of cancer in Encino, California, aged 76. He was cremated and interred at Grand View Memorial Park Cemetery in Glendale, California.

Partial filmography

 It's a Gift (1934) as Campfire Singer (uncredited)
 Bar 20 Rides Again (1935) as Background Singer / Henchman 
 Anything Goes (1936) as Member of The Avalon Boys (uncredited)
 Call of the Prairie (1936) as singing cowhand
 Hideaway Girl (1936) as Lead Singer of Avalon Boys 
 Way Out West (1937) as Lead Singer of the Avalon Boys / Stan's Bass Singing (uncredited)
 Nobody's Baby (1937) as Amateur Hour Lead Quartet Singer 
 Block-Heads (1938) as Midget in Elevator (voice, uncredited)
 Lawless Valley (1938) as Deputy Speedy McGow
 Arizona Legion (1939) as Whopper Hatch
 Trouble in Sundown (1939) as Whopper
 Sorority House (1939) as Mr. Johnson
 Racketeers of the Range (1939) as Whopper Hatch
 Timber Stampede (1939) as Whopper Hatch
 The Day the Bookies Wept (1939) as Man on Bus (uncredited)
 Allegheny Uprising (1939) as John M'Cammon
 Boom Town (1940) as Deputy Harmony Jones
 Wyoming (1940) as Lafe (uncredited)
 The Westerner (1940) as Southeast
 Sky Murder (1940) as Sheriff Beckwith
 Tugboat Annie Sails Again (1940) as Shiftless
 Western Union (1941) as Homer Kettle
 The Bad Man (1941) as 'Red' Giddings
 Billy the Kid (1941) as Tom Patterson
 Belle Starr (1941) as Blue Duck
 Honky Tonk (1941) as The Sniper
 The Bugle Sounds (1942) as Sgt. Larry Dillon
 Tarzan's New York Adventure (1942) as Manchester Montford
 Her Cardboard Lover (1942) as Judge
 The Omaha Trail (1942) as Henry Hawkins
 Apache Trail (1942) as 'Pike' Skelton
 Stand by for Action (1942) as Chief Boatswain's Mate Jenks
 A Stranger in Town (1943) as Charles Craig
 Best Foot Forward (1943) as Chester Short
 See Here, Private Hargrove (1944) as First Sgt. Cramp
 Rationing (1944) as Bus Driver (scenes deleted)
 Barbary Coast Gent (1944) as Sheriff Hightower
 Meet Me in St. Louis (1944) as Mr. Neely
 I'll Be Seeing You (1944) as Swanson
 Sunday Dinner for a Soldier (1944) as Mr. York
 What Next, Corporal Hargrove? (1945) as Sgt. Cramp
 Leave Her to Heaven (1945) as Leick Thome
 The Harvey Girls (1946) as H.H. Hartsey
 Gallant Bess (1946) as Chief Petty Officer
 The Yearling (1946) as Buck Forrester
 High Barbaree (1947) as Lars (uncredited)
 Heartaches (1947) as 'Breezie' Mann
 The Sainted Sisters (1948) as Will Twitchell
 Northwest Stampede (1948) as Mileaway
 The Saxon Charm (1948) as Captain Chatham
 That Wonderful Urge (1948) as Homer Beggs - Justice of the Peace - Monroe Township
 Family Honeymoon (1948) as Fred
 Loaded Pistols (1948) as Sheriff Cramer
 Tulsa (1949) as Pinky Jimpson (Narrator)
 Red Canyon (1949) as Brackton
 Francis (1950) as Francis the Talking Mule (voice, uncredited)
 The Sundowners (1950) as Sam Beers
 Rock Island Trail (1950) as Hogger McCoy
 Stella (1950) as Chief Clark (uncredited)
 High Lonesome (1950) as Boatwhistle, Ranch Cook
 Rio Grande (1950) as Dr. Wilkins (regimental surgeon)
 Oh! Susanna (1951) as Sergeant Barhydt
 Francis Goes to the Races (1951) as Francis the Talking Mule (voice, uncredited)
 Cattle Drive (1951) as Dallas
 The Sea Hornet (1951) as Swede
 Bronco Buster (1952) as Dan Bream
 Francis Goes to West Point (1952) as Francis the Talking Mule (voice, uncredited)
 Ride the Man Down (1952) as Ike Adams
 Small Town Girl (1953) as 'Happy', Jailer (uncredited)
 Francis Covers the Big Town (1953) as Francis the Talking Mule (voice, uncredited)
 City That Never Sleeps (1953) as Sgt. Joe, the 'Voice of Chicago'
 The Man from the Alamo (1953) as John Gage
 Tumbleweed (1953) as Sheriff Murchoree
 Francis Joins the WACS (1954) as Gen. Benjamin Kaye / Francis the Talking Mule (voice)
 Ricochet Romance (1954) as Tom Williams
 Hell's Outpost (1954) as Kevin Russel
 Timberjack (1955) as Steve Riika
 Kentucky Rifle (1955) as Tobias Taylor
 Francis in the Navy (1955) as Francis the Talking Mule (voice, uncredited)
 Santiago (1956) as Captain 'Sidewheel' Jones
 Giant (1956) as Uncle Bawley
 Gun for a Coward (1957) as Loving
 Gun Glory (1957) as Preacher
 From Hell to Texas (1958) as Amos Bradley 
 ‘’Alfred Hitchcock Presents’’ (1958) as Mr. Kilmer (segment “Don’t Interrupt”)
 The Sad Horse (1959) as Capt Connors
 The Alamo (1960) as Beekeeper
 Where the Boys Are (1960) as Police Captain
 Gold of the Seven Saints (1961) as Doc Wilson Gates
 The Little Shepherd of Kingdom Come (1961) as Major Buford
 The Deadly Companions (1961) as Turk, "a half-crazed card shark"
 Gunsmoke (1962) as Abe Blocker
 Young Guns of Texas (1962) as Preacher Sam Shelby
 McLintock! (1963) as Drago
 The Wheeler Dealers (1963) as Jay Ray Spinelby
 The Cardinal (1963) as Monsignor Whittle
 The Rounders (1965) as Jim Ed Love
 Fireball 500 (1966) as Big Jaw Harris
 Big Daddy (1969)
 The Over-the-Hill Gang (1969) as George Asque, retired Texas Ranger
 The Liberation of L.B. Jones (1970) as Mr. Ike
 The Over-the-Hill Gang Rides Again (1970) as George Asque
 Night Gallery (1970) as Heppelwhite (segment "The Little Black Bag")
 The Steagle (1971) as Tall-Guy McCoy
 Guns of a Stranger (1973) as Tom Duncan
 Pat Garrett & Billy the Kid (1973) as Lemuel
 Mr. Billion (1977) as Col. Clayton T. Winkle
 Poco... Little Dog Lost (1977) as Big Burt

References

External links

 
 
 
 

1902 births
1978 deaths
People from Dallas County, Texas
Male actors from Texas
American poker players
Deaths from cancer in California
American male film actors
People from Greater Los Angeles
Texas Republicans
20th-century American male actors
Burials at Grand View Memorial Park Cemetery
Male Western (genre) film actors
New Right (United States)